The Cherbourg Round Barn near Little Creek, Delaware is a round barn that was built in 1918.  It was listed on the National Register of Historic Places in 1978. Now destroyed, its walls were made of poured concrete.

References

Barns on the National Register of Historic Places in Delaware
Infrastructure completed in 1918
Buildings and structures in Kent County, Delaware
Round barns in Delaware
National Register of Historic Places in Kent County, Delaware